The Women's time trial of the 2006 Dutch National Time Trial Championships cycling event took place on 20 June 2006 in and around Oudenbosch, Netherlands over a 21.3 km long parcours.

Final results

Results from cyclingarchives.com and cqranking.com.

References

External links

Dutch National Time Trial Championships
2006 in women's road cycling